Foreign Keys is the second album released in 1985, 11th album overall, by musician Jandek, and his eleventh overall. This is the first Jandek album featuring a full band, and is without acoustic numbers. It is also an album split between tracks sung by Jandek and tracks sung by his female counterpart, assumed to be "Nancy". Nancy is possibly the same vocalist from "Nancy Sings" on Chair Beside a Window.

Track listing

External links
Seth Tisue's Foreign Keys review

Jandek albums
Corwood Industries albums
1985 albums